Beykoz 1908 SKD or commonly Beykoz 1908 is a sports club of Istanbul's historic Anatolian part district Beykoz, which was founded in 1908. Its colours are yellow and black.

The club was founded as Mümeresat-i Bedenye Şubesi, and was renamed Beykoz Şark İdman Yurdu in 1911. In the year 1921 it merged with Beykoz Zindeler İdman Yurdu and took its current name. The club's football team returned to the TFF Second League after 17 years, at the end of the 2007 – 2008 season.

The club's basketball team TTNet Beykoz competed in the Turkish Basketball League.

League participations

 Süper Lig: 1958–66
 1st League: 1966–71, 1972–79, 1980–84, 1986–91
 2nd League: 1971–72, 1979–80, 1984–86, 1991–2001, 2007–09
 3rd League: 2001–07, 2009–11
BAL: 2011–13
İstanbul Super Amateur League: 2013–

See also
List of Turkish Sports Clubs by Foundation Dates

References
 Beykoz Zindeler İdman Yurdu. Türk Futbol Tarihi vol.1. page(24). (June 1992) Türkiye Futbol Federasyonu Yayınları.

Sport in Beykoz
 
1908 establishments in the Ottoman Empire
Sports clubs established in 1908

de:Beykozspor
fr:Beykozspor 1908 AS
nl:Beykoz 1908
tr:Beykozspor 1908